Jacquelene "Jackie" Willmott (born 19 March 1965) is a retired British swimmer.

Swimming career
She won three medals in the 400 m and 800 m freestyle at the 1981 European Aquatics Championships and 1982 World Aquatics Championships. She competed in five events at the 1980 Summer Olympics with the best achievement of fourth place in the 4×100 metres freestyle relay. She represented England and won a gold medal in the 4 x 100 metres freestyle relay, a silver medal in the 400 metres freestyle and a bronze medal in the 800 metres freestyle, at the 1982 Commonwealth Games in Brisbane, Queensland, Australia.

She won the 1980 ASA National Championship title in the 200 metres freestyle, the 1980, 1981 and 1983 400 metres freestyle title  and four consecutive 800 metres freestyle championships.

Personal life
She is the sister of Olympians Stuart Willmott and Carrie Willmott, and the aunt of Olympian Aimee Willmott.

See also
 List of World Aquatics Championships medalists in swimming (women)

References

1965 births
Living people
English female freestyle swimmers
English female swimmers
Olympic swimmers of Great Britain
Swimmers at the 1980 Summer Olympics
Swimmers at the 1982 Commonwealth Games
World Aquatics Championships medalists in swimming
European Aquatics Championships medalists in swimming
Commonwealth Games gold medallists for England
Commonwealth Games silver medallists for England
Commonwealth Games bronze medallists for England
Commonwealth Games medallists in swimming
Medallists at the 1982 Commonwealth Games